Antigone (Greek: Ἀντιγόνη) of Troy is a minor figure in Greek mythology. She is the daughter of the Trojan king Laomedon and the sister of Priam. The meaning of the name is, as in the case of the masculine equivalent Antigonus, "worthy of one's parents" or "in place of one's parents".

Mythology 
Antigone claimed that her hair was more beautiful than that of the goddess Hera. Hera, who was angered by that claim, turned Antigone's hair into snakes. Later, another god, pitying her, turned her into a stork. Thereafter the stork preyed on snakes.

See also 
 Medusa

Note

References 
Michael Grant, John Hazel: Who's Who in Classical Mythology. Routledge 2001, p. 56 (restricted online version (google books))
Publius Ovidius Naso, Metamorphoses translated by Brookes More (1859-1942). Boston, Cornhill Publishing Co. 1922. Online version at the Perseus Digital Library.
Publius Ovidius Naso, Metamorphoses. Hugo Magnus. Gotha (Germany). Friedr. Andr. Perthes. 1892. Latin text available at the Perseus Digital Library.

Trojans
Princesses in Greek mythology
Metamorphoses into birds in Greek mythology
Deeds of Hera